The Beast of Dean is a folkloric animal said to live, or to have once lived, in the Forest of Dean, Gloucestershire, England. Despite attempts to encounter or kill the beast in the early 19th century, there is no scientific evidence to support the existence of the Beast of Dean or any other similar creature in the Forest of Dean.

History
Farmers from the village of Parkend undertook an expedition to capture and kill the creature, in 1802, but found nothing. The animal they were hunting was reported to be a boar large enough to fell trees and hedges. Since then, many 20th and early 21st Century references to the creature have been made by "cryptozoologists", who presumed the animal to be real but unknown to science, In 2007, the science-fiction television series Primeval, re-imagined the Beast of Dean as a gorgonopsid that arrived in the present day through a wormhole leading to the Permian period.

References

External links

English legendary creatures
Gloucestershire folklore
Mythological pigs
Cryptids